"In the Middle of the House" is a novelty song written by Bob Hilliard. It was performed by Vaughn Monroe and separately by Rusty Draper in 1956. Each was released as a single. Monroe's version reached number 11 on Billboard Magazine's Most Played by Jockeys chart and number 21 on the magazine's Top 100 chart in September 1956. Draper's version, released only weeks later, peaked lower on the Most Played by Jockeys chart, climbing to number 24. Draper outdid Monroe by one spot on the Top 100, peaking at number 20.  The song was quite popular in the UK as it was covered by Alma Cogan (# 20), Jimmy Parkinson (# 20) and the Johnston Brothers (# 27). All versions were in the UK charts simultaneously in November 1956.

In the song, a railroad, which is heard at the intro and the outro of the song, runs through the middle of the house. The narrator mentions a family friend, whom the narrator despises, is sent to the middle of the house, where the moving train transports him away. Also, a bill collector is sent to the middle of the house, where another oncoming train transports him away. In the end, the narrator states that he is singing this song from the middle of the house, where the sound of a railroad train transports him away from the home.

References

External links 

1956 singles
1956 songs
Novelty songs
Songs about trains
Songs with lyrics by Bob Hilliard
Vaughn Monroe songs